The 2022 Texas A&M–Commerce Lions football team represented Texas A&M University–Commerce as a member of the Southland Conference during the 2022 NCAA Division I FCS football season. They were led by head coach David Bailiff, who coached his third and final season with the program. The Lions played their home games at Memorial Stadium in Commerce, Texas.

This was the programs inaugural season in the Southland Conference.

Preseason

Preseason poll
The Southland Conference released their preseason poll on July 20, 2022. The Lions were picked to finish sixth in the conference.

Personnel

Schedule
Texas A&M–Commerce finalized their 2022 schedule on January 20, 2022.

Game summaries

Lincoln

at Tennessee Tech

at Sam Houston

North American

at No. 19 Southeastern Louisiana

at McNeese State

Houston Christian

No. 8 Incarnate Word

Northwestern State

at Nicholls

Tennessee State

References

Texas AandM-Commerce Lions
Texas A&M–Commerce Lions football seasons
Texas AandM-Commerce Lions football